is a Japanese swimmer who specializes in freestyle. He is a silver medalist at the World Championships.

Career
He competed in the men's 200 metre freestyle event at the 2017 World Aquatics Championships. At the 2019 World Aquatics Championships held in Gwangju, South Korea, Katsuhiro Matsumoto came third in the 200 m freestyle, but the first-placed finisher Danas Rapšys was disqualified for a false start, so Matsumoto was awarded a silver medal. He qualified to represent Japan at the 2020 Summer Olympics.

References

External links

1997 births
Living people
Place of birth missing (living people)
Universiade medalists in swimming
Asian Games medalists in swimming
Asian Games gold medalists for Japan
Asian Games silver medalists for Japan
Swimmers at the 2018 Asian Games
Medalists at the 2018 Asian Games
Universiade gold medalists for Japan
Universiade bronze medalists for Japan
World Aquatics Championships medalists in swimming
Medalists at the 2015 Summer Universiade
Medalists at the 2017 Summer Universiade
Japanese male freestyle swimmers
Swimmers at the 2020 Summer Olympics
Olympic swimmers of Japan
21st-century Japanese people